Anthology is the 24th album by Australian singer songwriter, Kate Ceberano. The album is a three-disc, 53-track greatest hits collection spanning her 30-year career and features all of her hits as well as rarities, live tracks, special projects, and duets with John Farnham, Ronan Keating, Paul Kelly, Wendy Matthews and David Campbell.

"I'm immensely proud of this collection of songs. It is my life's work in song to date and it's been amazing revisiting these memories. I hope everyone enjoys them as much as me," Kate said in a statement. Anthology was released on 6 May.

Critical reception

Cameron Adams from Herald Sun gave the album 3.5 out of 5 saying; "Kate Ceberano has been a proud, lifelong square peg - these 53 tracks the gloriously diverse proof of an increasingly rare kind of career. Her soulful '80s pop with I'm Talking hasn't dated, "Brave" showcases the in-house talent at Ceberano HQ, while disco/house gem "Love Dimension" may be her most underrated single. Even as Ceberano was busy charming the charts, she detoured into jazz and blues, still making dance and rock/pop and the epic Jesus Christ Superstar era. Anthology showcases her rampant song-writing, passionate covers and the fact you never know what's next."

Bernard Zuel from Sydney Morning Herald gave the album 2.5 out of 5 saying; "[Kate's] long, varied, mixed career is all here in a gargantuan triple-disc set. It begins with a "Pash", ends with a hymn and covers theatre, jazz, pop, dance(ish), duets and Christmas fare. It's impressive in its sweep and longevity, but the inadvertently telling absence of a central essay or even chronological written history in the packaging sums up the problem: it has been a career with no discernible pattern or solid beating heart that is purely her." adding "Love Don't Live Here Anymore" is one of her best moments.

Track listing
CD1

CD2

CD3

Charts

Release history

References

2016 greatest hits albums
Kate Ceberano albums
Compilation albums by Australian artists